Big Spring Baptist Church may refer to:

Big Spring Baptist Church (Midway, Kentucky), listed on the National Register of Historic Places in Woodford County, Kentucky
Big Spring Baptist Church (Elliston, Virginia), listed on the National Register of Historic Places in Montgomery County, Virginia